The Inspectorate-General of Army Aviation or  was a section of the Imperial Japanese Army Aeronautical Department charged with planning and supervision of the training of flying and air maintenance personnel of the Imperial Japanese Army Air Service.

It was under the control and supervision of the General Affairs Unit of Inspectorate of Army Aviation and Air Training and Instruction Department.

Composition
It was headed by an Inspector general who was responsible for the technical and tactical training of the Army Air service and of the other services related to the Air Service under the Ministry of War. It was composed of the following:

General Affairs (somobu) 
General Affairs (Administrative services) - personnel, finance, etc.
Section 1. Air General Training (related with Air Training and Instruction Department)
Section 2. Aircraft Research and Training Regulations (linked with Aircraft Research units and Tachikawa Air Arsenal)
Section 3. Special Air Schools (related with Air Training and Instruction Department)

Secondary Bureaus
Air Defense (AA units)
Airfield Engineering
Air Transport
Air Chemical Warfare unit
Air Intelligence and Communications

List of Inspector Generals of Aviation
Tomoyuki Yamashita: Inspector general of Army Aviation
Prince Mikasa: Inspector general of Army Aviation
Torashirō Kawabe: Deputy Chief, Inspectorate General of Air Force
Korechika Anami: Inspector General of Army Aviation
Hideki Tōjō: Inspector General of Army Aviation
Kenji Doihara: Inspector General of Army Aviation

Imperial Japanese Army
Aviation